Caleb T. Ward Mansion is a historic home located at 141 Nixon Avenue on Ward Hill, Staten Island, New York.  Caleb Tompkins Ward built the mansion in 1835 with the help of architect George B. David, who built the mansion out of stucco and brick in an imposing Greek Revival style. Ward acquired the land for his mansion in 1826, after his uncle died. His uncle was Daniel D. Tompkins, Governor of New York.

The mansion commands magnificent views of New York Harbor and the metropolitan area. It has a two-story tetra style portico and iconic columns. A large rectangular cupola tops the building and an estate of 250 acres originally surrounded the manor. Today, Ward Mansion is one of the last great houses remaining from a time when the North shore of Staten Island was a fashionable resort for wealthy New Yorkers.

On July 26, 1982, the mansion was added to the National Register of Historic Places, after having become a New York City Landmark in 1978.

See also
List of New York City Designated Landmarks in Staten Island
National Register of Historic Places listings in Richmond County, New York

References

Houses on the National Register of Historic Places in Staten Island
Greek Revival architecture in New York City
Greek Revival houses in New York (state)
Houses completed in 1835
New York City Designated Landmarks in Staten Island